A tertulia is a social gathering with literary or artistic overtones, especially in Iberia or in Spanish America. Tertulia also means an informal meeting of people to talk about current affairs, arts, etc. The word is originally Spanish (borrowed by Catalan and Portuguese), but it has only moderate currency in English, used mainly in describing Latin cultural contexts.

Format

A tertulia is rather similar to a salon, but a typical tertulia in recent centuries has been a regularly scheduled event in a public place such as a bar, although some tertulias are held in more private spaces, such as someone's living room. Participants, known as contertulios, may share their recent creations such as poetry, short stories, other writings, and even artwork or songs. Usually, but not always, the participants in a regularly scheduled tertulia are in some respects like-minded, with similar political or literary tastes.

Etymology
Philip II of Spain, in the 16th century, was very interested in the ancient world and its cultures. Within his court, he employed polymaths such as Juan de Mal Lara to compose poetry to accompany artworks which enriched his various palaces. Of great interest to the king were the works of the Christian author Quintus Septimius Florens Tertullianus. Courtiers and academics would gather to discuss such works with their royal patron, and so tertulia emerged as a term for learned discussion.

In Spanish America

At tertulias before 1810 in at the houses of  Buenos Aires society women such as Mercedes de Lasalde Riglos, Mariquita Sánchez de Thompson and Flora Azcuénaga the discussions led up to the May Revolution, the first stage in the struggle for Argentine independence from Spain.
"Madame Riglos" could be seen as the chief lady of the Tory (conservative) faction in Buenos Aires.
She was sparkling and familiar, although highly aristocratic.
Doña Melchora de Sarratea, queen of fashion and of the Buenos Aires salons, was so well aware of public and private affairs that she was held to be an enthusiastic supporter of Whig (liberal) principles.
Mariquita Sánchez de Thompson's forte was foreign relations.
Similar tertulias were being held during this period in Lima, Peru, by women such as Manuela Rábago de Avellafuertes de Riglos and Narcisa Arias de Saavaedra.

José Antonio Wilde (1813–87) described Buenos Aires in the period immediately following independence.
He wrote that it was a widespread custom among the more notable and well-to-do families, and also with many decent families, to give tertulias at least once a week.
Usually the guests danced only from 8:00 to 12:00 at night, in which case only mate was served, but if it went on later chocolate would be added.
Dress was not elaborate, and dancing, music and conversation were the only entertainment, so the cost was low.
A piano player might be hired, or the young people might play dance pieces, or some old and complacent aunt might play some contradanza.
Even if it was old, the thing was to dance.

See also
 Pulqueria
 Stammtisch
 Tertullian
 Viennese café

References

Sources

External links

 

Spanish culture
Latin American culture
Spanish words and phrases
Meetings